The Chevrolet Express, also rebadged as the GMC Savana, is a range of full-size vans built and sold by General Motors since the 1996 model year, succeeding the prior GM G-series vans, which were marketed as the Chevrolet Van and GMC Rally/Vandura. The Express/Savana was updated for the 2003 model year with revised styling and chassis upgrades.

The Express and Savana are produced in three configurations, including passenger vans, cargo vans, and a cutaway van chassis; the latter vehicle is a  chassis cab variant developed for commercial-grade applications, including ambulances, buses, motorhomes and small trucks.  

In production since 1995, the Express/Savana is one of the longest-produced American automotive designs in automotive history (rivaled only by the Jeep Wagoneer and Dodge Ram Van for longevity).  General Motors assembles the model line at its Wentzville Assembly facility (Wentzville, Missouri).  Since 2017, production of the model line has also been sourced from Navistar International through its Springfield, Ohio assembly plant.

Model history

First generation (1996–2002) 

For the 1996 model year, Chevrolet replaced the G-series Chevrolet Van with the Chevrolet Express (retaining Chevrolet Van for cargo vans).  The first all-new design for the General Motors full-size van line since 1971, the model line was offered in passenger and cargo-van variants (the latter initially retained the Chevrolet Van name), with GMC replacing the Vandura/Rally with the Savana.  Alongside the first substantial redesign of the model line in 25 years, GM predicted substantial growth in the full-size segment through the end of the 1990s.

In a major functional change, the front axle was moved forward 10 inches, effectively moving the front wheels out of the passenger compartment; along with improving front legroom, the design allowed a reduction in step-in height (improving access).  While sharing the same engines as the previous model line, the size of the engine cover was reduced, further increasing front passenger space. On all vehicles below 8500 lbs GVWR (1500 and 2500 series), the Express was introduced with standard dual airbags; for 1997, dual airbags were standardized for all versions of the model line.

For 1999, a few minor functional changes were made to the model line. In a more noticeable update, Chevrolet retired the Chevrolet Van nameplate entirely, with the cargo van renamed the Express Cargo Van.

Second generation (2003–present) 

For 2003, the Express underwent a mid-cycle revision.  Alongside substantial frame and chassis upgrades, the bodywork forward of the windshield was revised.  Distinguished by a higher hood line, the newer front fascia (developed as an improved crumple zone) was brought closer in line with the GMT800 full-size pickup trucks introduced for 1999; the model line also introduced a degree of parts commonality between the two model lines.  The dashboard underwent a redesign; along with the addition of dual-stage airbags, the interior added multiplex wiring (adding increased functionality to the interior electrical system).

The Express was offered with 60/40 split panel doors on the passenger-side of the vehicle; in a first (since the Corvair cargo van), an option was added for the driver-side to receive the same split panel doors; this option was limited to the standard-length body (requiring doors on both sides). The option for the driver-side split 60/40 panel doors was available through at least model year 2014.

Since its 2003 model revision, the Express has seen incremental updates to the model line.  For 2008, the Express passenger van received side-curtain airbags and standard stability control (introduced for 3500-series vans for 2005); the steering wheel, seats, and gauge cluster were also redesigned.  For 2011, the dashboard received upgrades (including Bluetooth compatibility and a USB port).  For 2013, higher-trim passenger vans received a optional navigation system, rearview camera, and parking assist system.  For 2015, all radios became digitally-tuned and a 120-volt outlet was added to the dash.  For 2018, the Express dropped sealed-beam headlights from all models, adopting the four composite headlamps of higher-trim passenger vans.  For 2019, higher-trim passenger vans received lane departure warning systems and collision alert warning features.

An All Wheel Drive (AWD) was offered as an option for the model years 2003-2014.  The AWD models came exclusively with GM's 5.3L V8.

For 2022, the optional CD player was discontinued. Entering its 26th year of production, the Chevrolet Express has now overtaken its third-generation G-series Chevrolet Van predecessor in production longevity.

Although it is anticipated that GM will discontinue the Express/Savana and replace it with a plug-in battery electric vehicle for the 2026 model year, using GM's Ultium battery technology and possibly sharing a platform with the BrightDrop Zevo, GM instead may introduce an updated Express for the 2027 model year, retaining internal combustion engines.

Model overview

Chassis 
The Chevrolet Express uses the GM GMT600 chassis, developed exclusively for full-size vans.  Derived loosely from the GMT400 chassis of the fourth-generation C/K trucks, the model line uses a full-length ladder frame with boxed forward frame rails.  The GMT600 chassis was offered in two wheelbases: standard-length 135-inch and extended 155-inch.  A replacement for the 110-inch short-wheelbase van (discontinued after 1992) was not included as part of the GMT600 design, as the short-body van had functionally been superseded by the Chevrolet Astro/GMC Safari mid-size vans.

For 2003, the GMT600 chassis underwent a substantial revision and was redesignated GMT610.  In line with the GMT800 chassis, the GMT610 adopted a three-section fully-boxed frame.  With slight modifications, the GMT610 also adopted the front suspension of the GMT800 pickup trucks, with short-long arm front suspension (rear-wheel drive) and torsion-bar front springs (all-wheel drive).  In another change, four-wheel disc brakes were introduced, standardizing anti-lock brakes (ABS).  In a first for the full-size van segment, the GMT610 platform was also offered with full-time all-wheel drive as an option.

Powertrain details 
At its launch, the Chevrolet Express was introduced with five engines.  Shared with C/K pickup trucks, a 4.3L V6 was standard, with 5.0L, 5.7L, 6.5L turbodiesel and 7.4L V8s were options.  All gasoline engines adopted the "Vortec" port-fuel injection upgrades for 1996, increasing power and torque outputs; the 6.5L turbodiesel was offered in a full-size van for the first time.  All engines were paired with a 4-speed overdrive automatic, carried over from the Chevrolet Van; 1500-series vehicles used a 4L60E transmission while 2500 and 3500-series vehicles used a heavier-duty 4L80E unit.

For 2001, the Vortec 7400 was replaced by the longer-stroke Vortec 8100 (at 496 cubic inches, this is the largest-displacement engine ever factory-marketed by Chevrolet); the engine was offered for the Express through 2002.

For 2003, the engine lineup underwent a series of revisions, retaining only the 4.3L V6 from 2002.  The "Generation III" small-block V8 engines (based on the LS-series engines) were introduced, with the Express receiving 4.8L, 5.3L, and 6.0L V8s.

For 2006, a diesel engine offering returned, adopting a detuned version of the 6.6L Duramax V8 (LGH) from the Chevrolet Kodiak.  For 2008, 5.3L V8s on 1500-series vans gained flex-fuel (E85) capability.

For 2010, 2500 and 3500-series vans used the six speed 6L90 transmission.

Coinciding with the discontinuation of the 1500-series, the Vortec 4300 V6 (the final engine derived from the original Chevrolet small-block V8) was discontinued in 2014.

After 2016, the 6.6L Duramax diesel V8 was discontinued; a 2.8L inline-4 Duramax (the first four-cylinder in a full-size Chevrolet van since 1964) replaced it as the diesel engine offering.  For 2018, an "EcoTec3" 4.3L V6 was introduced as the base gasoline engine (sharing little more than its displacement with the Vortec 4300); the same year, CNG/LPG capability was added as an option to the 6.0L V8.

For 2021, the 6.0L V8 was replaced by an all-new 6.6L V8 (L8T).

The 1500 series either has a 3.42 or 3.73 axle.  The 2500 and 3500 series van will have a 3.73 axle or 4.10 axle.

Body design 
Far more aerodynamic than its predecessor, the Chevrolet Express derived much of exterior styling from the Chevrolet Astro mid-size van (including its flush-mounted exterior glass), deriving its grille from multiple trims of the Chevrolet C/K pickup trucks.  Similar to the APV minivans, the Express adopted high-mounted taillamps (besides the rear windows), placed above the rear door hinges.  In a design advancement for the market segment, the rear doors are hinged to open nearly 180 degrees, allowing the vehicle to back up to a loading dock.

The cargo van is offered as a two-passenger vehicle (initially with an optional passenger seat delete); the passenger van is offered as a 5, 8, 12, or 15-passenger vehicle (the latter, only with the extended 155-inch wheelbase).

In reverse of its predecessor, 60/40 split side doors were standard, with a sliding door offered as an option (initially at no cost).  From 2003 to 2008, side doors were offered on the driver side; only the split-panel doors were offered, and only on standard-wheelbase bodies.

Trim 

For its 1996 launch, Chevrolet used the Chevrolet Express model name for full-size passenger vans, with Chevrolet Van returning for cargo vans (renamed Express Cargo Van for 1999).

The Express passenger van was introduced with two trim lines: an unnamed base trim (geared largely towards fleet sales) replacing the Sportvan and the upgraded LS, replacing the Beauville.  For 2001, an upgraded LT trim was introduced, but was dropped for 2003.  For 2006, the trim line was revised again to the current nomenclature, with the base trim renamed LS, and LS renamed LT.

In line with the previous Chevrolet Van, the Express uses "G" as its internal model designator ("H" was used for all-wheel drive vans during their production).  In line with C/K pickup trucks, the Express/Savana adopted the 1500/2500/3500 payload series designations.  After the 2014 model year, the -ton 1500-series was discontinued (with GM citing it as the lowest-selling version).

Variants

GMC Savana (1996-present) 

Since 1996, GMC has marketed the GMC Savana as its version of the Chevrolet Express.  In line with Chevrolet, GMC consolidated the previous GMC Vandura (cargo van) and GMC Rally/Rally STX (passenger van) under a single nameplate, with Savana offered as a passenger van, cargo van, and as a cutaway-chassis vehicle (see below).  

With the exception of its grille and GMC divisional badging, the GMC Savana is essentially identical to the Chevrolet Express.  Using the same LS and LT trims as Chevrolet, the Savana is the only current GMC model line not offered with Denali trim.   

Sharing the same model development as its Chevrolet counterpart, the Savana has undergone only minor detail changes since 2003.  As of current production, the Express outsells the Savana approximately three-to-one.

GMT560 (2003-2009) 

For 2003, General Motors introduced the GMT560 medium-duty truck architecture for Chevrolet, GMC, and Isuzu.  The vertically-oriented cab from the full-size van line replaced the pickup-truck cab previously used.  Alongside a two-door configuration, GMT560 vehicles offered a four-door crew cab configuration.  

Produced as a Class 5-7 truck, the GMT560 vehicles (the Chevrolet Kodiak, GMC TopKick, and Isuzu H-Series) were offered in 4x2, 4x4, and 6x4 drive for multiple applications.

After 2009, General Motors ended medium-duty truck production, leading to the discontinuation of the GMT560 chassis.

Cutaway chassis (1997-present) 

For 1997, GM introduced a cutaway-chassis version of the 1-ton 3500-series Express/Savana.  Replacing the previous G30/G3500 (the larger "HD" variant was not replaced), the cutaway-chassis Express/Savana is an incomplete vehicle (a chassis produced with no bodywork aft of the front seats) intended for additional fabrication by a second-party manufacturer.  Intended for a wide variety of potential applications, cutaway chassis are best known as the basis of ambulances, buses (shuttle buses and school buses), and recreational vehicles (RVs); they also are fitted with delivery truck bodies or utility bodies (increasing their storage space over a standard cargo van).

Offered with either Chevrolet Express and GMC Savana branding on both the GMT600 and GMT610 platforms, the cutaway chassis is still offered on the 3500 series in both dual rear-wheel and single rear-wheel configurations (the latter, trading increased maneuverability for lower GVWR).  For 2009, GM introduced a 4500-series Express/Savana developed specifically for cutaway applications, raising its GVWR to 14,200 pounds.

Since 2017, GM has outsourced production of GMT610 cutaway-chassis vehicles, contracting production to Navistar International.

VTRUX Van 
VIA Motors previously converted Chevrolet Express vans into electric vehicles since 2014. This was the first Chevrolet-derived van to be built with an electric powertrain ever since the 1980s with the Griffon van which was a heavily modified version of the British Bedford CF Electric.

Other uses of nameplate 

Chevrolet used the Express nameplate for the first time on a 1987 concept car designed for future limited-access highways.  The vehicle was turbine-powered with drive-by-wire controls.

References

External links

 
 GMC Savana (twin model)

Express
Vans
2000s cars
2010s cars
Cars introduced in 1995
Motor vehicles manufactured in the United States
All-wheel-drive vehicles
Rear-wheel-drive vehicles
School bus chassis